Sega is one of the major music genres of Mauritius and Réunion. The other genres common in Mauritius are its fusion genre Seggae and Bhojpuri songs while in Réunion there is also seggae and maloya. It has origins in the music of slaves as well as their descendants Mauritian Creole people and is usually sung in Mauritian Creole or Réunionese Creole. Sega is also popular on the islands of Agaléga and Rodrigues as well as Seychelles, though the music and dances differ and it is sung in these islands' respective creole languages. In the past, the Sega music was made only with traditional instruments like ravanne and triangle, it was sung to protest against injustices in the Mauritian society, this particular version of the Sega is known as Santé engagé. Other types of Sega (Traditional Mauritian Sega, Sega tambour Chagos, Sega tambour of Rodrigues Island) have been included in UNESCO's Intangible Cultural Heritage lists.

Description
The music's traditional form was largely improvised and intensely emotional and expressed the tribulations of a subjugated, initially enslaved, people.
It is primarily dance music but was also used for dirges and as part of traditional exorcisms.

Instruments
Traditional instruments include:
the maravanne (rattle)
moutia (hand drum)
the goatskin drum ravanne
dhol
dholak
tabla
mandar
taal
Gong
Cymbal
Cymbals
tambourine
ghunghru
nagada
congas
bongos
sitar
shehnai
cowbell
danka
triangle
and the bobre (bow).
There is also the tantam which a stringed instrument consisting of a gourd with a bow attached played in time to the drum. Nowadays, electric guitars and keyboards are used.

Lyrics
The lyrics of sega music usually relate to the lives of the inhabitants; they do not usually relate to the musicians' ancestral homeland.

Dance
Sega is danced without the feet ever leaving the ground. Instead, the rest of the body moves.

History

Origins
Sega music originated among the slave populations of Mauritius and Réunion and later spread throughout the Seychelles. It is usually in 6/8 meter and has an associated dance form.

Sega's exact origins outside the islands are unknown. However, it is understood to have Afro-Malagasy roots and be a fusion of African or Malagasy music with European music. The European influence includes folk dance music like polka, waltz and quadrilles.

Gatan Benoit suggested that sega came from Madagascar and Boswell notes there may be a link between sega and famadihana, a Merina death ritual. Arago instead identifies it with (t)chéga from Mozambique. He states that it is similar to the fandango and chica (dance) from Brazil whose origins are in African music from Mozambique and Angola. It was termed "African" by sega musician Jacques Cantin.

Place in society
Sega was for long looked down upon because it was the music of slaves. It was also looked down upon by the Catholic Church, which was not keen on its association with sexuality and alcohol.

Until the Mauritian Ti Frère became popular in the 1960s, sega was only played in private places. A particularly big turning point was his performance at the Night of the Sega at Mount Le Morne on 30 October 1964. It is now considered the national music of Mauritius and not restricted by ethnicity.

Modern varieties
Sega is now popular across the islands of Mauritius, Réunion, Seychelles, Comoros, Mayotte and Rodrigues, along with parts of Madagascar. In its modern form, sega is combined with genres like jazz, zouk, and its fusion genre with reggae known as Seggae. Elements of African music have been added to sega since the 1980s.

Santé engagé

Santé engagé is a genre of Mauritian music which consists of singing protest songs. It is a way to protest against injustices through music. The genre mixes traditional Mauritian sega with Indian influences.

Seggae

Seggae is a fusion of sega with reggae, a kind of Jamaican popular music that is very popular across sega's range. Seggae musicians include Ras Natty Baby, Sonny Morgan and the man seen as being the founder, Kaya. Kaya, whose real name is Joseph Reginald Topize, was at the height of his career in 1999 when he was found dead in a prison cell. Riots followed soon after causing one of the major social upheavals in Mauritius. Kaya's music is, however, still very popular and has inspired contemporary musicians to expand the Seggae genre.

Regional varieties

Réunion

In Réunion, sega is relatively slow, and is danced by couples who are not as physically close as on Mauritius. There is some confusion as to the usage of the words maloya and sega. What was called sega in historical accounts from previous centuries is similar to what is nowadays called maloya. The word "sega", on the other hand, is used to describe the fusion genre of the Afro-Malagasy and the European.

Rodrigues

Traditional Rodriguan sega is Sega tambour, where the drum is more prominent. Sega tambour is considered to be truer to the origins of sega than Mauritian sega, due to Rodrigue's geographical isolation. The accordion groups of Rodrigues, segakordeon, include European folk dance music such as polkas, quadrilles, waltzes and Scottish reels. Rodrigue music is extremely swift compared to other varieties. These sega tambours are sung mostly by women and are danced only by one couple at a time, accompanied by clapping or the use of improvised percussion instruments like table legs and glasses. The accordion was not being played so much by young people but an initiative involving the European Union are giving accordion lessons to young Rodriguans.

Seychelles

One form of Seychellois sega is called Moutya and is similar to Réunionnais sega. Seychellois music is influenced by Western ballads, and especially country music. Increasingly, Reggae, Rock, hip hop, jazz, electronic dance music, house music and pop style Seychellois music have become popular locally as well as internationally with the wider Seychellois community.

Chagos Islands

The Chagos Islanders also had their own variety of sega before they were deported from the islands to make way for the American military base Diego Garcia.

See also
 Music of Mauritius
 Seggae
 Santé engagé

References

 
Mauritian Creole